Alena Analeigh Wicker (born ) is an American student who is the youngest Black person to be accepted into medical school in the United States, and the second-youngest person to be accepted into medical school overall. She is also the youngest person ever to work as an intern at NASA.

Personal life 
Wicker was born in Fontana, California, and grew up outside of Fort Worth, Texas. Her mother is Daphne McQuarter, and she has two sisters. 

Wicker began reading chapter books when she was three years old and developed a love for Lego the following year. In elementary school, Wicker was bullied for her intelligence, and her principal said she "couldn't get all A's because of [her] skin color". Shortly after, McQuarter opted to homeschool her, though Wicker returned to school in fifth grade, continuing an advanced curriculum to complete high school requirements.

She spent time living abroad in Amman, Jordan, which inspired her to learn Arabic and Spanish.

Education 
Wicker graduated from her high school near Fort Worth, Texas at age 12, after which she began attending Arizona State University. Wicker initially double-majored in astronomical and planetary science and chemistry, hoping to one day be a NASA engineer. After a trip to Jordan with The Brown STEM Girl foundation, she became interested in viral immunology and switched her major to pre-med. 
On May 13, 2022, the University of Alabama at Birmingham's Heersink School of Medicine offered Wicker admission in 2024 through the school’s Burroughs Wellcome Scholars Early Assurance Program, "which partners with several Black schools in Alabama to offer students early acceptance as they plan to enter medical school." Wicker accepted the offer later that summer.

Career 
While completing high school, Wicker "noticed the racial and gender disparities in the science, technology, engineering and mathematics (STEM) fields," which led her to develop The Brown STEM Girl (BSG) website. Wicker imagined using BSG to  "create this culture of Brown girls in STEM." She developed a business plan and contacted business people to get the foundation started. BSG provides scholarships, mentorships, internships, and other support to girls of color pursuing education in STEM. BSG also offers opportunities for girls of color to study abroad in Singapore.

In 2021, Wicker became the youngest person to intern for NASA. There, she "worked on various assignments including remote research for the Jet Propulsion Laboratory in La Cañada Flintridge, California."

On July 28, 2022, Wicker appeared on Good Morning America to discuss her early acceptance into medical school and to offer advice to other young people.
https://www.goodmorningamerica.com/living/video/13-year-makes-history-accepted-medical-school-87538306

Awards and honors 
Because of Wicker's work, multiple mayors have proclaimed April 30 "Brown STEM Girl STEM in the City Day Honoring Women of Color in STEM." The governor of Texas has also included a proclamation.

She is also an Ambassador for Saving Our Daughters/Keke Palmer Foundation.

References

External links 
 The Brown STEM Girl Foundation

American women scientists
People from Fontana, California
People from Fort Worth, Texas
Arizona State University people
2000s births
Living people
American children